The Guam national futsal team represents Guam in international futsal competitions and is controlled by the Guam Football Association. They are affiliated to the Asian Football Confederation's East Asian Football Federation region.

Tournaments

FIFA Futsal World Cup
 1989 – Did not enter
 1992 – Did not enter
 1996 – Did not enter
 2000 – Did not enter
 2004 – Did not qualify
 2008 – Did not enter
 2012 – Did not enter
 2016 – Did not enter
 2020 – To be determined

AFC Futsal Championship
 1999 – Did not enter
 2000 – Did not enter
 2001 – Did not enter
 2002 – Did not enter
 2003 – Did not enter
 2004 – Group stage
 2005 – Group stage
 2006 – Did not enter
 2007 – Did not qualify
 2008 – Did not enter
 2010 – Did not qualify
 2012 – Did not enter
 2014 – Did not enter
 2016 – Did not enter

EAFF Futsal Championship
 2009 – Group stage
 2013 – Did not enter

References

Asian national futsal teams
Futsal